Nature Reviews Urology is a monthly peer-reviewed medical journal published by Nature Portfolio. It covers all aspects of urology. The journal was established in 2004 as Nature Clinical Practice Urology and obtained its current title in April 2009. The editor-in-chief is Annette Fenner.

According to the Journal Citation Reports, the journal has a 2021 impact factor of 16.430, ranking it 4th out of 90 journals in the category "Urology & Nephrology".

References

External links 
 

Nature Research academic journals
Publications established in 2004
Urology journals
Monthly journals
English-language journals
Review journals